The John Heinz National Wildlife Refuge at Tinicum is a 1000-acre (4.05 km2) National Wildlife Refuge in Philadelphia and Tinicum Township, Pennsylvania. Adjacent to Philadelphia International Airport, the refuge is designed to the largest remaining freshwater tidal marsh in Pennsylvania. Established in 1972 as the Tinicum National Environmental Center, it was renamed in 1991 after the late H. John Heinz III, who helped preserve Tinicum Marsh.

History

The Lenape people are the first known settlers of the area that is now known as Philadelphia. For generations, these indigenous people stewarded the land we know as Tinicum Marsh. The Lenape called this land Tennakon Minquas or "islands of the marsh". It was a marshland that spread for more than 5,000 acres across the landscape. The Lenape lived off the plentiful bounty of the marshland, fishing, hunting, and gathering in the around the marshes until the mid-1600s when European settlers arrived. These settlers drained and filled the marshes to provide grazing and farming land. Over the years, as the Philadelphia region grew, the marshes continued to disappear. 

In the late 1760's it is discovered by the Darby Society of Friends that the Elliot family were running a slave plantation on Smith Island. This is contrary to their orders of discipline. A committee of Nathan Garrett & William Horne are sent to negotiate a settlement. After at least 25 visits, Elliot and the visiting committee come to an agreement ( 1765). He agrees to codify this in his will.  In his will, he gives a house and 2 acres of land at Smith Field (now part of Tinicum Wildlife Preserve) and a pension, to his slave Old Primus, who is freed immediately.  He also provides for eight negroes besides Old Primus. Through the deal brokered by the Darby Friends Meeting and written into Enoch's will, they are to be manumitted when they reached 30 years of age. Their names are: Frank, Joe, Betts, Rack, Young Primus, Dina, Peter and Nance. In the meantime, custody is split between his two sons. The will forbids that they be sold or hired out of the area. Enoch dies in 1767. His son, Christopher, tries to circumvent the will and is sued by Quakers Thomas Shipley & Isaac Hopper working through The Pennsylvania Anti-Slavery Society.

By the 1950s, Tinicum Marsh had gone from more than 5,000 acres to only 200 acres. 

In 1953, Allston Jenkins, a birdwatcher who lived in the Chestnut Hill section of Philadelphia, learned of Gulf Oil's plans to dredge the Schuylkill River and dump the spoils into the Marsh. He banded together with other birders and activists to form the Philadelphia Conservationists (later known as Natural Lands, the region's oldest and largest land conservation organization). The group successfully fought the destruction of Tinicum Marsh and a non-tidal area of 145 acres, adjacent to the eastern end of Tinicum Marsh, was donated by the Gulf Oil Corporation to the City of Philadelphia in 1955. This area, administered for the benefit of wildlife and people, was known as Tinicum Wildlife Preserve. The areas of open water along with the adjacent heavily vegetated tidal wetlands, formed an ideal habitat for thousands of migratory birds.

In 1969, threats to Tinicum Marsh continued to rise with the proposed routing of Interstate 95 through the marsh and the construction of a landfill. Local residents and organizations began to take action, as they had seen enough habitat destruction done to the marshlands. They worked together to begin a long series of legal injunctions, public hearings, and extraordinary efforts that stopped both the highway's rerouting and the landfill's operation.

In 1972, Congress passed legislation authorizing the protection of up to 1,200 acres and established Tinicum National Environmental Center. In 1991, the refuge was renamed posthumously to honor Senator John Heinz and his commitment to the conservation of the marsh.

Topography
The refuge has five varied habitats: freshwater tidal marsh, impounded water, woods, meadow and field. The diversity of such habitats in such a concentrated area make it a natural magnet for all forms of wildlife. In addition to the above-mentioned there are a wide variety of fish species that can be found in both, Darby Creek, the lifeblood of Tinicum Marsh, as well as the 145 acre (0.6 km2) impoundment and the smaller, Hoy's Pond. They include brown bullhead, channel catfish, crappie, carp and small striped bass that utilize the wider expanses of Darby Creek, just before its confluence with the Delaware River, in the earlier stages of their development. The fields and meadows provide open areas where wide arrays of insects including several species of butterflies can be found foraging the dozens of species of wildflowers.

Wildlife and protected species
The refuge is home to a variety of wildlife despite its urban location. Birdwatchers have recorded over 300 species of birds in and around the refuge, 85 of which nest here. Migratory birds like warblers, egrets, sandpipers, and a large variety of ducks, within the Atlantic Flyway, use the refuge as a resting/feeding spot during spring and fall flights. Since water levels can be controlled in the impoundment, the water is often drained in early fall at the refuge. This serves both to reduce the large population of invasive carp and makes the impoundment a large mudflat, which renders it very attractive to migrating shorebirds. The water levels are raised later in the fall so waterfowl can use the impoundment.

In addition, deer, opossums, red foxes, raccoons, coyotes, beavers, river otters, minks, woodchucks, and muskrats take refuge here along with a wide variety of wildflowers and plants.

Bats are frequently observed by visitors on the refuge during warmer seasons and a formal species diversity and population survey would provide valuable information on recent declines of these important creatures due to white nose syndrome and habitat disturbances.

There are several species of reptiles and amphibians that call the refuge home including the northern water, garter and DeKay's brown snakes; pickerel, wood and southern leopard frogs (the latter listed as endangered in Pennsylvania) and the state threatened American red-bellied turtle as well as the painted, snapping and eastern box turtles.

Climate
John Heinz National Wildlife Refuge at Tinicum lies in the transition zone between the Temperate Continental climate to the north and the Humid subtropical climate to the south. According to the Trewartha climate classification system, the refuge has a Temperate Oceanic climate (Do) with hot summers (a), cool winters (k) and year-around precipitation. Doak climates are characterized by all months having an average mean temperature > , four to seven months with an average mean temperature ≥ , at least one month with an average mean temperature ≥  and no significant precipitation difference between seasons. Although most summer days are moderately humid at John Heinz National Wildlife Refuge, episodes of heat and high humidity can occur with heat index values > . The average wettest month is July which corresponds with the annual peak in thunderstorm activity. Since 1981, the wettest calendar day was 6.58 inches (167 mm) on 08/27/2011. Episodes of extreme cold and wind can occur with wind chill values < . Ice storms and large snowstorms depositing over 12 inches (30 cm) occur once every several years, particularly during nor'easters from December through February.

Facilities

Trails
Trail segments are a part of the East Coast Greenway, a 3,000 mile long system of trails connecting Maine to Florida.

Canoeing
A  segment of Darby Creek flows through the refuge allowing canoeists to see a variety of plants and animals.

Points of interest around the Creek's deep water lagoon are:
The Sun Oil Company tank farm;
The defunct Delaware County Sewer Treatment Plant;
Action Concrete's recycling operation;
The  Folcroft Landfill (active from 1956 to 1974), now capped and monitored;
The historic Morton Mortensen House in Norwood's Winona Park, built in the early eighteenth century by adding to an old Swedish house built 60 years before, and believed to be the oldest man-made structure in Pennsylvania.

Fishing
Fishing is permitted along the main dike trail and the connecting Trolley Bed trail. This area provides fishing in both the 145 acre (0.6 km2) impoundment and Darby Creek. Common fish are carp, catfish, large-mouth bass and smaller panfish. Another fishing area is near Tinicum and Prospect Park on the west side of Route 420 which provides access to the lagoon areas of the refuge. Common fish in this area are striped bass, carp, catfish, panfish, and tiger musky. However, due to the preserve's urban location, the stream has been polluted with various industrial chemicals.  As a result, signs have been put into place in order to discourage the consumption of the fish that reside in the stream.

See also

 List of National Wildlife Refuges
 List of parks in Philadelphia

References

External links

 John Heinz NWR at Tinicum homepage
 Recreation.gov overview
 Natural Lands homepage

1972 establishments in Pennsylvania
Landforms of Delaware County, Pennsylvania
Landforms of Philadelphia
National Natural Landmarks in Pennsylvania
National Wildlife Refuges in Pennsylvania
Nature centers in Pennsylvania
Parks in Delaware County, Pennsylvania
Parks in Philadelphia
Protected areas established in 1972
Protected areas of Delaware County, Pennsylvania
Protected areas of Philadelphia
Schuylkill River National and State Heritage Area
Southwest Philadelphia
Wetlands of Pennsylvania